Eupithecia severa is a moth in the family Geometridae. It is endemic to central China (Shaanxi).

The forewings are pale brownish grey with a yellowish tinge and hindwings are slightly lighter.

References

External links

Moths described in 2006
Endemic fauna of China
Moths of Asia
severa